The Battlefords is the collective name given to the adjacent communities of the City of North Battleford and the Town of Battleford in west-central Saskatchewan, Canada. As of the 2011 census, the two communities have a combined population of 18,744 and a total regional population of 19,623.

The Battlefords are served by the Highway 16 (Yellowhead Highway), Highway 4, Highway 29, and Highway 40 (Poundmaker Trail).

North Battleford CA 
Census agglomerations (CA) is the term Statistics Canada uses to determine the demographics of urban areas with a population between 10,000 and 100,000 people.  The North Battleford CA includes the North Battleford, Battleford, and the Rural Municipality of North Battleford No. 437. The Rural Municipality of Battle River No. 438, which encompasses the Town of Battleford, as well as the Sweet Grass Indian Reserve No. 113-M16 were part of the North Battleford CA in 2011, but were removed in 2016.

List of census subdivisions

References 

North Battleford